ITE College Central (ITECC) is a post-secondary education institution and statutory board under the purview of the Ministry of Education in Singapore.

It is one of the Institute of Technical Education's three colleges under the "One ITE System, Three Colleges" Governance and Education Model. The college also houses the headquarters of the Institute of Technical Education.

Campus
This third comprehensive college covers a land area of 10.61 hectares with a total gross floor area of 192,820m2. It opened to its first cohort of students in January 2013. There is also a convention centre which is named the Tay Eng Soon Convention Centre to commemorate for his efforts.  The campus was officially opened on 8 November that year by Prime Minister Lee Hsien Loong.

The campus that replaced the 5 original campuses moved to its current premises at Ang Mo Kio drive in December 2012 together with ITE Headquarters and welcomed its first cohort of students in January 2013.  It was officially opened on 8 November by Prime Minister Lee Hsien Loong and ITE College Central has been chosen almost annually as the venue for Singapore National Day Rally speech ie. in 2019, 2021 and 2022.

Academic schools and courses
ITE College Central has four schools; School of Business & Services, School of Design & Media, School of Electronics & Info-Communications Technology and School of Engineering, running a total of 51 courses.

Notable alumni 
 Romeo Tan – Actor of MediaCorp

References

 https://www.channelnewsasia.com/singapore/national-day-rally-2018-aug-19-pm-lee-hsien-loong-ite-803621

External links

Institutes of Technical Education in Singapore
Schools in Ang Mo Kio
Education in North-East Region, Singapore
Education in Singapore